Fahrudin Radončić (born 24 May 1957) is a Bosnian media magnate, entrepreneur, investor, and politician who served as the Minister of Security on two occasions. He is the founder of the Dnevni avaz, the best-selling newspaper in Bosnia and Herzegovina and is the founder and current president of the Union for a Better Future of BiH.

From 2015 to 2019, Radončić was also a member of the national House of Peoples.

Biography
Born in Ivangrad, SR Montenegro, SFR Yugoslavia, Radončić finished elementary and high school in Titograd. He started working in journalism at 19, and at 23 he was editor of the Republican Youth Magazine "Youth Movement in Podgorica". In the same period he got involved in politics as a member of the League of Communists of Montenegro, serving as executive secretary of the Republican Organization of the Union of Communists in Titograd until 1988. His family originates from Kuči. He has stated that his mother is of Albanian origin.

From 1989 until the beginning of the war in Bosnia and Herzegovina, he worked as a commentator and correspondent for Montenegro's Danas weekly. In 1990 he published the book "10,000 Days of Slavery", a biography of Adem Demaçi, an Albanian who spent 28 years in the prisons of the SFR Yugoslavia while fighting for Kosovo's independence. 

The same year Radončić moved from Podgorica to Sarajevo where he founded the publishing house Avaz in 1991.

In 1992, at the start of the war, Radončić joined the Army of the Republic of Bosnia and Herzegovina (ARBiH), serving for a year as member of the cabinet of General Sefer Halilović, Chief of Staff of the ARBiH Supreme Command.

In October 1993, while living in besieged Sarajevo, he launched the weekly publication Bošnjački avaz (English: Bosniak voice). The first texts published in this magazine, dated 15 November 1993, were strongly opposed to the division of Bosnia and Herzegovina". In October 1995, through his publishing company, Radončić launched Dnevni avaz (English: Daily voice).

In 2000, he constructed the first Avaz building (today Addiko Bank building in Sarajevo), in 2004 the Radon Plaza Hotel, and in 2007 he won the largest public acknowledgement for contribution to the reconstruction of Sarajevo Canton. In 2006, the construction of the Avaz Twist Tower began, the highest building in Bosnia and Herzegovina and in the Balkans. It was completed in a record two years. In 2012, his company built the largest business centre in Tuzla.

Radončić founded his own party in September 2009, the Union for a Better Future of BiH, as a centre-right Bosniak party. 
Since then, he has served twice in government as Minister of Security, the first time from 22 November 2012 until 29 April 2014 (Vjekoslav Bevanda cabinet), and the second time since 23 December 2019 until 2 June 2020 (Zoran Tegeltija cabinet). From 16 February 2015 until 28 February 2019, Radončić was a member of the national House of Peoples.

He competed for the Bosniak post of member of the Presidency of Bosnia and Herzegovina in 2010, 2014 and 2018, each time losing to the Party of Democratic Action (SDA) candidates, Bakir Izetbegović and Šefik Džaferović.

On 2 June 2020, Radončić resigned as Minister of Security over a migration dispute with other members of the Bosnian government led by Zoran Tegeltija; he proposed the deportation of 9,000 migrants which the cabinet voted against.

His first wife is the Montenegrin journalist Snježana Rakonjac, with whom he had a son. In 1994, Radončić married Azra Bučan, with whom he had two sons. In May 2012, they divorced.

Works
Adem Demaçi. Deset tisuca dana robije (Confession. One Thousand Days of Imprisonment), Danas Verlag, Zagreb 1990
Bosna ce opstati (Bosnia will remain), Danas Verlag, Zagreb 1991
Goodbye, Bosnia, Danas Verlag, Zagreb 1991

References

External links

Dnevni Avaz

1957 births
Living people
People from Berane
Bosniaks of Montenegro
Albanians in Montenegro
Bosnia and Herzegovina people of Albanian descent
Bosnia and Herzegovina people of Montenegrin descent
Bosnia and Herzegovina journalists
Bosnia and Herzegovina politicians
Army of the Republic of Bosnia and Herzegovina soldiers
Union for a Better Future of BiH politicians
Government ministers of Bosnia and Herzegovina
Security ministers of Bosnia and Herzegovina